"There Goes My Heart" is a song recorded by British singer Lisa Stansfield for the re-release of her 2014 album Seven, titled Seven+. It was written by Stansfield and her husband Ian Devaney, and produced by Devaney. "There Goes My Heart" was released as a single to promote the album on 8 December 2014. Seven+ also includes three remixes of "There Goes My Heart." Two of them were created by the Danish/German soul production duo, Cool Million. The music video for "There Goes My Heart" was directed by Ian Devaney and premiered on 22 October 2014. Stansfield performed the song during her Seven Tour in 2014. On 24 February 2015, "There Goes My Heart" and "So Be It" were released as a double A-side 7" single in the United Kingdom. It includes remixes created by Soul Talk (Ernie McKone and Toby Baker).

Track listings
Promotional single
"There Goes My Heart" (Ash Howes Radio Mix)

7" single
"There Goes My Heart" (SoulTalk Remix)
"So Be It" (SoulTalk Remix) – 4:11

Other remixes
"There Goes My Heart" (Cool Million Remix) – 4:40
"There Goes My Heart" (Cool Million Goldchain + Moustarche Remix) – 4:17
"There Goes My Heart" (Heartful Dodger Remix) – 6:01

Credits and personnel

Songwriting – Lisa Stansfield, Ian Devaney
Production – Ian Devaney
Mixing – Peter Mokran
Engineer – Stephen Boyce-Buckley
Vocals recording – Stephen Boyce-Buckley, Ian Devaney
Keyboards and programming – Ian Devaney
Percussion – Snowboy
Guitar – Ben Barker
Drums – Kevin Whitehead
Trumpet and flugelhorn – John Thirkell
Saxophone and flute – Mickey Donnelly
Violins – Andrew Price, Clare Dixon, Karen Mainwaring, Rachel Porteous
Viola – Martin Wallington
Cello – Peter Dixon
Horns arrangement – Ian Devaney, John Thirkell

Release history

References

Lisa Stansfield songs
2014 singles
2014 songs
Songs written by Lisa Stansfield
Songs written by Ian Devaney
Soul ballads
2010s ballads